The CDP Awards are a series of annual sporting awards given by the Sports Confederation of Portugal (Confederação do Desporto de Portugal, CDP) to highlight sporting achievements over the preceding year. In addition to honouring athletes and coaches nominated by the national sporting federations within Portugal, awards determined in-part by public voting are also presented. There are currently five awards open to voter participation: Sportsman of the Year, Sportswoman of the Year, and Coach of the Year awards, which were introduced in 2005, and the Young Promise and Team of the Year awards, introduced in 2006 and 2007 respectively.

The awards are presented at a ceremony held at the Casino Estoril in Cascais.

Nomination procedure
Contenders for the five awards subject to a public vote are first nominated by the national federation of the sport in which the athlete competes. A jury selected by the CDP then narrows down the nominees to five finalists for each award. From these finalists the winners are chosen with a weighted vote split between the public and attendees of the ceremony. In 2010, the public voting constituted 60% of the final decision with the remaining 40% determined by in-person voting of the ceremony attendees. 

Federations are limited to forwarding just one candidate to be evaluated for each award; the choice of which can therefore attract media comment and criticism. In 2008 the sports newspaper Record noted the continued absence of footballer Cristiano Ronaldo from the shortlist for Sportsman of the Year, after the Portuguese Football Federation instead nominated Fernando Couto in deference to the CDP's chosen theme for 2008 of Amor à Camisola (Love of the Jersey). In 2015 the Portuguese Judo Federation caused what Record described as "perplexity in several quarters" after nominating Joana Diogo for Sportswoman of the Year over three-time winner Telma Monteiro, who had earlier that year won her fifth European title and was ranked as the highest Portuguese judoka in the world. The decision was criticised by both Diogo and her coach.

Sportsperson of the Year

By year

By number of wins
The below tables list all those who have won Sportsman or Sportswoman of the Year more than once.

By sport
The below table lists the total number of Sportsperson of the Year awards won by the winners' sporting profession.

Other main categories

CDP High Prestige

Notes

References

External links
Official website

National sportsperson-of-the-year trophies and awards
Sport in Portugal
Portuguese awards